A coalfield is an area of certain uniform characteristics where coal is mined.  The criteria for determining the approximate boundary of a coalfield are geographical and cultural, in addition to geological. A coalfield often groups the seams of coal, railroad companies, cultural groups, and watersheds and other geographical considerations. At one time the coalfield designation was an important category in business and industrial discussions.  The terminology declined into unimportance as the 20th century progressed, and was probably only referred to by a few small railroads and history buffs by the 1980s.  Renewed interest in industrial heritage and coal mining history has brought the old names of the coalfields before a larger audience.

Australia

New South Wales
Gunnedah Basin coalfields
Hunter Valley coalfields
South Maitland coalfields
Sydney Basin coalfields

Queensland
Bowen Basin coalfields
Galilee Basin coalfields
Surat Basin coalfields
Walloon coalfields

Victoria
Latrobe Valley coalfields

Western Australia
Collie coalfields

Belgium
Borinage Coalfield (Middle Ages – 1973)
Campine Coalfield (1917–1992)
Centre Coalfield (Middle Ages – 1973)
Charleroi Coalfield (Middle Ages – 1984)
Liege Coalfield (Middle Ages – 1980)

Canada

Ardley coalfield
Beersville Coalfield
Carbon-Thompson coalfield
Comox Coalfield
Crowsnest coalfield
Cypress Coalfield
Daly-Weaver coalfield
Dominion coalfield
Drumheller coalfield
East Kootenay coalfield
Elk Valley Coalfield
Estevan Coalfield
Flathead Coalfield
Gething coalfield
Hat Creek Coalfield
Howley Coalfield
Inverness Coalfield
Joggins River Herbert Coalfield
Lethbridge coalfield
Mabou Coalfield
MacKay coalfield
Mannville coalfield
Merritt Coalfield
Minto Coalfield
Nanaimo Coalfield
Onakawana Coalfield
Peace River coalfield
Pictou Coalfield
Princeton Coalfield
St. George Coalfield
St Rose-Chimney Corner Coalfield
Spring Hill Coalfield
Sydney Coalfield
Taber coalfield
Tulameen Coalfield
Willow Bunch Coalfield
Wood Mountain Coalfield

Chile

Lirquén Coalfield, Penco, Bío Bío Region
Puchoco Coalfield, Coronel, Bío Bío Region
Lota Coalfield, Lota, Bío Bío Region
Curanilahue Coalfield, Curanilahue, Bío Bío Region
Boca Lebu Coalfield, Lebu, Bío Bío Region
Mulpún Coalfield, Mafil, Los Ríos Region
Loreto Coalfield, Punta Arenas, Magallanes Region

China

Juye coalfield
Sha'er Lake coalfield
Zhunggar coalfield

Colombia

Colombia has the largest coal reserves in Latin America and is a major exporter.
Cerrejón, in La Guajira
Guajira coalfield

France
Aumance Coalfield
Blanzy Coalfield
Brassac Coalfield
Carmaux Coalfield
Champagnac Coalfield
Dauphiné Coalfield
Decazeville Coalfield
Epinac Coalfield
Gard Coalfield
Hérault Coalfield
Loire Coalfield
Lorraine Coalfield (1820–2004)
La Machine Coalfield
Messeix Coalfield
Nord-Pas-de-Calais Coalfield (1852–1990)
Provence Coalfield
St Eloi Coalfield

Germany
Aachen Coalfield
Erkelenz Coalfield (1914–1997)
Inde Coalfield (Middle Ages – 1944)
Wurm Coalfield (Middle Ages – 1992)
Ibbenbüren Coalfield (Middle Ages – 2018)
Lugau-Oelsnitz Coalfield (1844–1971)
Ruhr Coalfield (Middle Ages – 2018)
Saar Coalfield (Middle Ages – 2012)
Zwickau Coalfield (Middle Ages – 1979)

Great Britain

England
Bristol and Somerset Coalfield
Bristol Coalfield
Cheadle Coalfield
Clee Hills Coalfield
Coalbrookdale Coalfield
Cumberland Coalfield
Durham Coalfield
East Staffordshire Coalfield
Forest of Dean Coalfield
Ingleton Coalfield
Kent Coalfield
Lancashire Coalfield
Burnley Coalfield
South Lancashire Coalfield
Manchester Coalfield
Oldham Coalfield
St Helens Coalfield
Wigan Coalfield
Leicestershire and South Derbyshire Coalfield
Midgeholme Coalfield
Newent Coalfield
Oxfordshire-Berkshire Coalfield
North Staffordshire Coalfield
Northumberland Coalfield
Nottinghamshire and Derbyshire Coalfield
Oswestry Coalfield
Shrewsbury Coalfield
Shropshire Coalfield
Somerset Coalfield
South Staffordshire Coalfield
Cannock Chase Coalfield
Warwickshire Coalfield
Wyre Forest Coalfield
Yorkshire Coalfield
South Yorkshire Coalfield

Scotland
Ayrshire Coalfield
Central Ayrshire Coalfield
South Ayrshire Coalfield
Brora Coalfield
Canonbie Coalfield
Central Coalfield
Clackmannan Coalfield
Dailly Coalfield
Douglas Coalfield
Fife Coalfield
Central Fife Coalfield
East Fife Coalfield
West Fife Coalfield
Lanarkshire Coalfield
Lothians Coalfield
Machrihanish Coalfield
Midlothian Coalfield
Northeast Stirlingshire Coalfield
Sanquhar Coalfield
Scremerston Coalfield

Wales
Anglesey Coalfield
North Wales Coalfield
Denbighshire Coalfield
Flintshire Coalfield
Pembrokeshire Coalfield
South Wales Coalfield

India
 
South Eastern Coalfields
Chirimiri Coalfield
Daltonganj Coalfield
Deoghar Coalfield
Delhi-Jaipur Coalfield
East Bokaro Coalfield
Ib Valley Coalfield
Jharia Coalfield
Jhilimili Coalfield
Kamptee Coalfield
Korba Coalfield
Makum Coalfield
Mand Raigarh Coalfield
Namchik-Namphuk Coalfield
North Karanpura Coalfield
Pench Kanhan Coalfield
Rajmahal coalfield
Ramgarh Coalfield
Raniganj Coalfield
Singareni Coalfield
Singrauli Coalfield
Sohagpur Coalfield
South Karanpura Coalfield
Talcher Coalfield
Umaria Coalfield
Wardha Valley Coalfield
West Bokaro Coalfield

Japan

Hokkaidō
Ishikari coalfield
Kayanuma coalfield
Kushiro coalfield
Rumoi coalfield
Tenpoku coalfield

Honshū
Jōban coalfield
Omine coalfield
Ube coalfield

Kyūshū
Amakusa coalfield
Chikuhō coalfield
Miike coalfield
Nishisonogi coalfield

New Zealand

kapuka
Rotowaro
Stockton

The Netherlands
Limburg Coalfield (Middle Ages – 1974)
Peel Coalfield (1955–1962)

Pakistan

Thar Coalfield

Poland

Lower Silesia Coalfield
Lublin Coalfield
Upper Silesian Coal Basin

South Africa

 Ermelo Coalfield
 Highveld Coalfield
 Klip River Coalfield
 Utrecht Coalfield
 Waterberg Coalfield
 Witbank Coalfield

Ukraine

Bogdanovskoye coalfield
Donets Coalfield, sometimes known by its misnomer Donetsk Coalfield
Lviv-Volhynian Coalfield
Dnieper Coalfield (lignite)

United States

Alabama
Warrior Coalfield
Cahaba Coalfield
Coosa Coalfield
Lookout Mountain Coalfield
Sand Mountain Coalfield

Alaska
Nenana Coalfield

Arkansas
Arkansas Valley Coalfield

Colorado
Book Cliffs Coalfield
Boulder-Weld Coalfield
Canyon City Coalfield
Colorado Springs Coalfield
Crested Butte Coalfield
Dan Forth Hills Coalfield
Durango Coalfield
Grand Hogback Coalfield
Grand Mesa Coalfield
North Park Coalfield
Nucla Naturita Coalfield
Pagosa Springs Coalfield
Somerset Colorado Coalfield
South Park Coalfield
Trinidad Coalfield
Yampa Coalfield

Illinois
Harrisburg Coalfield
Southern Illinois

Indiana
Southwestern Indiana

Iowa
Appanoose-Wayne Coalfield
Eldora Coalfield
Fort Dodge Coalfield
Walnut Creek Coalfield

Kansas
Pittsburg-Weir Coalfield

Kentucky

Cicinnatti-Southern Coalfield
Cumberland Gap Coalfield
Elkhorn Coalfield
Harlan Coalfield
Hazard Coalfield
Jellico Coalfield
Kenova Coalfield
Paintsville Coalfield
Thacker Coalfield
West Kentucky Coalfield

Maryland
Cassellman Coalfield
Georges Creek Coalfield
Lower Youghiogheny Coalfield
Upper Potomac Coalfield
Upper Youghiogheny Coalfield

North Carolina
Dan River Coalfield
Deep River Coalfield

Ohio
Amsterdam-Salineville Coalfield
Cambridge Coalfield
Coshocton Coalfield
Crooksville Coalfield
Federal Creek Coalfield
Goshen Coalfield
Hocking Coalfield
Ironton Coalfield
Jackson Coalfield
Lisbon Coalfield
Massillion Coalfield
Meigs Creek Coalfield
Palmyra Coalfield
Pittsburgh No. 8 Coalfield
Pomeroy Coalfield

Oklahoma
Arkoma Basin Coalfield
Northeastern Shelf Coalfield
Oklahoma Coalfield

Oregon
Coos Bay Coalfield

Pennsylvania
Anthracite Coalfield (Coal Region)
Beaver Coalfield
Bennetts Branch Coalfield
Bernice Coalfield
Black Lick Coalfield (aka Nanto Glo Coalfield)
Blossburg Coalfield
Broad Top Coalfield
Butler Coalfield
Cameron Coalfield
Clarion Coalfield
Clearfield Coalfield
Connellsville Coalfield
Freeport Coalfield
Georges Creek Coalfield
Indian Valley Coalfield
Indiana Coalfield
Irwin Gas Coalfield
Keating Coalfield
Kittanning Coalfield
Klondike Coalfield
Ligonier Coalfield
Low Grade Division Coalfield
Mercer Coalfield
Meyersdale Coalfield
Moshannon Coalfield
Mountain Coalfield
Pittsburgh Coalfield
Punxsutawney Coalfield
Ralston Coalfield
Shawmut Coalfield
Snowshoe Coalfield
Somerset Pennsylvania Coalfield
Westmoreland Coalfield
Windber Coalfield

Tennessee
Cumberland Gap Coalfield
Jellico Coalfield
Lafollette Coalfield
Rockwood Coalfield
Soddy Coalfield
Wartburg Coalfield

Utah
Blacktail Coalfield
Book Cliffs Coalfield
Castlegate Coalfield
Coalville Coalfield
Emery Coalfield
Harmony Coalfield
Henry Mountains Coalfield
Kaiporonitis Plateau Coalfield
Kolob Plateau Coalfield
Sunnyside Coalfield
Teton Basin Coalfield
Vernal Coalfield
Wasatch Plateau

Virginia
Buchanan Coalfield
Clinch Valley Coalfield
Pocahontas Coalfield
Richmond Coalfield
Southwestern Coalfield (Big Stone Gap Coalfield)
Valley Coalfield (anthracite)

West Virginia
Elkins Coalfield
Fairmont Coalfield
Greenbrier Coalfield
Kanawha Coalfield
Logan Coalfield
Meadow Branch Coalfield (anthracite)
New River Coalfield
Panhandle Coalfield
Pocahontas Coalfield
Upper Potomac Coalfield
Williamson Coalfield
Winding Gulf Coalfield

Wyoming
Bighorn Coalfield
Black Hills Coalfield
Goshen Hole Coalfield
Green River Coalfield
Hams Fork Coalfield
Hanna Coalfield
Jackson Hole Coalfield
Powder River Coalfield (aka Gillette Coalfield)
Rock Creek Coalfield
Wind River Coalfield

Venezuela

Guasare coalfield

See also
List of oil fields
Major coal producing regions

References

Lesher, C.E. State of Kentucky – Coalfields and Producing Districts (Map). Scale 1:1,000,000. Washington D.C. U.S. Geological Survey. 1919
Lesher, C.E. State of West Virginia and Part of Maryland – Coalfields and Producing Districts (Map). Scale 1:1,000,000. Washington D.C. U.S. Geological Survey. 1919
Lesher, C.E. State of Ohio – Coalfields and Producing Districts (Map). Scale 1:1,000,000. Washington D.C. U.S. Geological Survey. 1919
Lesher, C.E. State of Pennsylvania – Coalfields and Producing Districts (Map). Scale 1:1,000,000. Washington D.C. U.S. Geological Survey. 1919
Lesher, C.E. State of Virginia – Coalfields and Producing Districts (Map). Scale 1:1,000,000. Washington D.C. U.S. Geological Survey. 1919
Lesher, C.E. State of Tennessee – Coalfields and Producing Districts (Map). Scale 1:1,000,000. Washington D.C. U.S. Geological Survey. 1919
Lesher, C.E. State of Alabama and Part of Georgia – Coalfields and Producing Districts (Map). Scale 1:1,000,000. Washington D.C. U.S. Geological Survey. 1919

Notes

External links
Coal Camp USA: Coalfields of the Appalachian Mountains
Coal Mining in the British Isles (Northern Mine Research Society)
Online mapping of Coal Mining sites in the British Isles (Northern Mine Research Society)

 List of coalfields
Geography-related lists